A Far Cry is a film about displaced persons in South Korea, following the Korean War (1950 - 1953). It was commissioned by the NGO Save the Children Fund UK and was broadcast in the UK by the BBC in 1959. It appears on the programme of two International Film Festivals in 2015.

How it came about

The Save the Children UK archive records:

The  International Documentary Film Festival Amsterdam 2015 brochure adds: 

The 1959 Radio Times account of the film gives more information: 

The Melbourne International Film Festival 2015 brochure adds:

. . . and then

The film was a success. Save the Children continued using film to inform and fund-raise.

Stephen Peet subsequently made many more documentary films for BBC TV, with the series title Yesterday's witness.

Sources
 BBC Genome project: Entry for A Far Cry, indicating that the film was broadcast on 29-03-1959: , accessed 13-06-2015
  British Film Institute website - , accessed  13-06-2015
  National Archive: note of records held by Save the Children UK of the film work of the SCF Public Affairs Department.  , accessed 13-06-2015
  Melbourne International Film Festival  (MIFF) Festival programme 30-07 to 15-08-2015: Festival Archive - http://miff.com.au/festival-archive/film/14395, accessed 15-06-2015
  International Documentary Film Festival Amsterdam 18–29 November 2015 - website , accessed 13-06-2015

References

Documentary films about South Korea
British documentary films
Documentary films about children in war
1959 films
1959 documentary films
Korean War films
Save the Children
1950s British films